The men's hammer throw event at the 1955 Pan American Games was held at the Estadio Universitario in Mexico City on 16 March.

Results

References

Athletics at the 1955 Pan American Games
1955